Titus is an unincorporated community in Elmore County, Alabama, United States. Titus has a post office with ZIP code 36080.

Notable people
Joe Sewell - Hall of Fame Shortstop with the Cleveland Indians and the New York Yankees
Luke Sewell - Professional baseball player, coach, and manager with multiple teams
Tommy Sewell - Professional baseball player who played in one game for the Chicago Cubs
James M. Sprayberry, recipient of the Medal of Honor during the Vietnam War

References

Unincorporated communities in Elmore County, Alabama
Unincorporated communities in Alabama